The Wang Yun-wu Memorial Hall is a memorial hall in Da'an District, Taipei, Taiwan, dedicated to Wang Yun-wu, the former Vice Premier of the Republic of China.

Transportation
The building is accessible within walking distance west from Technology Building Station of Taipei Metro.

References

Tourist attractions in Taipei
Buildings and structures in Taipei